Juan Guillermo López Soto (February 10, 1947 – September 8, 2021) was a Mexican Roman Catholic prelate.

Biography
He served as the Bishop of the Roman Catholic Diocese of Cuauhtémoc-Madera, based in Chihuahua state, for 26 years from November 1995, until his death in September 2021. 

On August 30, 2021, the Diocese of Cuauhtémoc-Madera announced that López Soto had tested positive for COVID-19. He was admitted to Hospital Ángeles, a private hospital in the city of Chihuahua for treatment. López also suffered from several pre-existing cardiac conditions, including three heart surgeries in September 2018 for an obstructed artery, followed by a heart attack days after the operations.

Bishop Juan Guillermo López Soto died from complications of COVID-19 at the Hospital Ángeles in Chihuahua on September 8, 2021, at the age of 74. He had planned to retire in February 2022 when he reached the mandatory retirement age of 75.

References

1947 births
2021 deaths
Mexican Roman Catholic bishops
20th-century Roman Catholic bishops in Mexico
21st-century Roman Catholic bishops in Mexico
Bishops appointed by Pope John Paul II
Deaths from the COVID-19 pandemic in Mexico
People from Ciudad Cuauhtémoc, Chihuahua